The Ronald V. Dellums Federal Building complex is a federal building complex in Oakland, California, constructed as part of the Oakland City Center redevelopment project. In 1998, the United States Congress passed a bill naming the building for former mayor and Congressman Ronald V. Dellums. It consists of two identical towers topped with pyramid-shaped roofs, echoing similar landmarks such as the Alameda County Courthouse. The towers are connected by a ground level rotunda and an elevated sky bridge. The podium of one of the towers houses a federal courthouse.

History
During the George Floyd protests, on May 30, 2020, a Federal Protective Service officer was shot and killed and another was wounded in an attack outside the building. The officer slain was providing security services during a protest near the courthouse.

References

Federal buildings in the United States
Skyscraper office buildings in Oakland, California
Federal courthouses in the United States
Twin towers
Postmodern architecture in California
Leadership in Energy and Environmental Design gold certified buildings